|}

The 51st Kerala State Film Awards, presented by the Kerala State Chalachitra Academy were announced by the Minister for Cultural Affairs, Saji Cheriyan in Thiruvananthapuram on 16 October 2021. A total of 80 films competed for the awards.

Writing category

Jury

Awards
All award recipients receive a cash prize, certificate and statuette.

Film category

Jury

Awards
All award recipients receive a cash prize, certificate and statuette.

Special Jury Mention
All recipients receive a certificate and statuette.

References

External links 
https://www.keralafilm.com

Kerala State Film Awards
2020 Indian film awards